Miranpur (URDU: ميرانپور)is a well known Union Council of Teh. Rojhan (Mazari), RajanPur District in Province of Punjab. This UC is the Capital Seat and headquarters of the Mistaghani Mazari Baloch tribe who have held this territory since 1632. Prior to this the Mazari Tribe were settled in the Bambore Hills of the present day Kohlu district in Balochistan.

Sardar Mistagh Khan Mazari
This village is on the name of Sardar Mistagh Khan Mazari and his Tomb is also in Miranpur.

Main areas
Miran Pur
tahlyan (Dera Dildar)
Badli Mazari
roor

Basic facilities
This village has basic facilities of rural areas with Basic Health Unit, Boys High School, Girls Primary School and a railway station in Badli Mazari which is known as Badli station.

See also
Rojhan Mazari
Dera Dildaar
baloch

Populated places in Rajanpur District